Federico Serra (born 9 December 1997) is an Italian football player who plays for the Akron Zips.

Club career
He made his professional debut in the Serie A for Cagliari on 5 February 2017 as a 79th minute substitute for Marco Capuano in a 0–2 loss against Atalanta.

On 14 September 2018, he joined Eccellenza club Monastir Kosmoto.

In 2019, Serra moved to the United States to attend the University of Akron and play on their soccer team.

References

External links
 
 [Akron Zips bio https://gozips.com/sports/mens-soccer/roster/federico-serra/6454]

1997 births
Sportspeople from Cagliari
Living people
Italian footballers
Cagliari Calcio players
Serie A players
Association football midfielders
Footballers from Sardinia
Akron Zips men's soccer players
Expatriate soccer players in the United States
Italian expatriate footballers
Italian expatriate sportspeople in the United States